Raoul-Pierre Pictet (4 April 1846 – 27 July 1929) was a Swiss physicist. Pictet is co-credited with French scientist Louis-Paul Cailletet as the first to produce liquid oxygen in 1877.

Biography 
Pictet was born in Geneva. He served as professor in the university of that city. He devoted himself largely to problems involving the production of low temperatures and the liquefaction and solidification of gases.

On December 22, 1877, the Academy of Sciences in Paris received a telegram from Pictet in Geneva reading as follows: Oxygen liquefied to-day under 320 atmospheres and 140 degrees of cold by combined use of sulfurous and carbonic acid. This announcement was almost simultaneous with that of Cailletet who had liquefied oxygen by a completely different process.

Pictet died in Paris in 1929.

Works 
 
 
 Nouvelles machines frigorifiques basées sur l'emploi de phénomènes physicochimiques (1895)
 Étude critique du matérialisme et du spiritualisme par la physique expérimentale (1896)
 L'acétylène (1896)
 Le carbide (1896)
 Zur mechanischen Theorie der Explosivstoffe (1902)
 Die Theorie der Apparate zur Herstellung flüssiger Luft mit Entspannung (1903)

See also
Liquefaction of gases
Timeline of low-temperature technology
Pictet Family Archives  — includes a family tree since 1344
Pictet's apparatus
Production of oxygen under pressure in a retort
Two pre-cooling refrigeration cycles: 1. SO2(-10 °C) 2. CO2 (-78 °C) oxygen flow is pre–cooled by the means of heat exchangers  and expands to atmosphere via a  hand valve

References 

1846 births
1929 deaths
Scientists from Geneva
Swiss physicists
Swiss non-fiction writers
Swiss male writers
Male non-fiction writers